37 Cancri is a star in the zodiac constellation of Cancer. It is a challenge to view with the naked eye, having an apparent magnitude of 6.54. The star is moving away from the Earth with a heliocentric radial velocity of +22 km/s, having come as close as  some 2.7 million years ago.

This is an ordinary A-type main-sequence star with a stellar classification of A1 V, which indicates it is generating energy through hydrogen fusion at its core. It is spinning with a projected rotational velocity of 35 km/s. The star has 2.7 times the mass of the Sun and around 1.8 times the Sun's radius. It is radiating 31 times the luminosity of the Sun from its photosphere at an effective temperature of 9,830 K.

References

A-type main-sequence stars
Cancer (constellation)
Durchmusterung objects
Cancri, 37
042353
042353
3412